Westgate is a city in Fayette County, Iowa, United States. The population was 192 at the time of the 2020 census, down from 234 in 2000.

History
Westgate celebrated "Westgate Days" on July 16, 2011, in honor of its 125th anniversary.

Geography
Westgate is located at  (42.768467, -91.995265).

Demographics

2010 census
As of the census of 2010, there were 211 people, 88 households, and 56 families living in the city. The racial makeup of the city was 98.6% White, 0.9% African American, and 0.5% from two or more races. Hispanic or Latino of any race were 0.5% of the population.

There were 88 households, of which 27.3% had children under the age of 18 living with them, 52.3% were married couples living together, 4.5% had a female householder with no husband present, 6.8% had a male householder with no wife present, and 36.4% were non-families. 27.3% of all households were made up of individuals, and 7.9% had someone living alone who was 65 years of age or older. The average household size was 2.40 and the average family size was 2.96.

The median age in the city was 42.6 years. 22.3% of residents were under the age of 18; 9.5% were between the ages of 18 and 24; 23.2% were from 25 to 44; 31.7% were from 45 to 64; and 13.3% were 65 years of age or older. The gender makeup of the city was 51.2% male and 48.8% female.

2000 census
As of the census of 2000, there were 234 people, 90 households, and 63 families living in the city. The racial makeup of the city was 100.00% White. Hispanic or Latino of any race were 1.28% of the population.

There were 90 households, out of which 33.3% had children under the age of 18 living with them, 61.1% were married couples living together, 5.6% had a female householder with no husband present, and 30.0% were non-families. 23.3% of all households were made up of individuals, and 17.8% had someone living alone who was 65 years of age or older. The average household size was 2.60 and the average family size was 3.10.

In the city, the population was spread out, with 27.8% under the age of 18, 6.8% from 18 to 24, 24.8% from 25 to 44, 23.5% from 45 to 64, and 17.1% who were 65 years of age or older. The median age was 37 years. For every 100 females, there were 91.8 males. For every 100 females age 18 and over, there were 77.9 males.

The median income for a household in the city was $30,750, and the median income for a family was $43,438. Males had a median income of $29,375 versus $18,594 for females. The per capita income for the city was $14,709. About 1.5% of families and 7.6% of the population were below the poverty line, including 4.5% of those under the age of eighteen and 4.0% of those 65 or over.

Economy

Despite its small size, Westgate maintains a restaurant, fire department, public library, and a church, St. Peter's Lutheran. The unemployment rate is 8.1%, 0.9% below the national average.

Education
The West Central Community School District operates local area public schools.

References

Cities in Fayette County, Iowa
Cities in Iowa
1886 establishments in Iowa